Grand Lake is an unincorporated community in Chicot County in the U.S. state of Arkansas.

History
The town served as a docking point for boats on the Mississippi River prior to the American Civil War. It was also the location of a plantation owned by Isaac H. Hilliard in the Antebellum South.

The A. Landi General Merchandise Building is listed on the National Register of Historic Places.

References

Unincorporated communities in Chicot County, Arkansas
Unincorporated communities in Arkansas